Scythris fluxilis is a moth species of the family Scythrididae. It was described by Mark I. Falkovitsh in 1986. It is found in Mongolia, Kazakhstan and Uzbekistan.

References

fluxilis
Moths described in 1986
Moths of Asia